The 2017 Fed Cup was the 55th edition of the most important tournament between national teams in women's tennis. The final took place on 11–12 November and was won by the United States .

World Group

Seeds

Draw

Final

Belarus vs. United States

World Group play-offs 

The four losing teams in the World Group first round ties, and four winners of the World Group II ties entered the draw for the World Group play-offs. Four seeded teams, based on the latest Fed Cup ranking, were drawn against four unseeded teams.

Seeds

World Group II 

The World Group II was the second highest level of Fed Cup competition in 2017. Winners advanced to the World Group play-offs, and losers played in the World Group II play-offs.

Seeds

World Group II play-offs 

The four losing teams in World Group II play off against qualifiers from Zonal Group I.

Seeds

Americas Zone

Group I 

Location: Club Deportivo la Asunción, Metepec, Mexico (outdoor hard)

Dates: 6–11 February

Participating teams

Pool A

Pool B

Play-offs 

   was promoted to the 2017 Fed Cup World Group II play-offs.

Group II 
Venue: Centro de Alto Rendimiento Fred Maduro, Panama City, Panama (outdoor clay)

Dates: 19–22 July

Participating teams

Pool A
 
 
 

Pool B
 
 
 

Pool C
 
 
 

Pool D

Play-offs 

Asia/Oceania Zone

Group I 
Venue: Daulet National Tennis Centre, Astana, Kazakhstan (indoor hard)

Dates: 8–11 February

Participating teams

Pool A
 
 
 

Pool B

Play-offs 

  was promoted to the 2017 Fed Cup World Group II play-offs.
  were relegated to Asia/Oceania Zone Group II in 2018.

Group II 
Venue: Pamir Stadium, Dushanbe, Tajikistan (outdoor hard)

Dates: 18–23 July

Participating teams

Pool A
 
 
 

Pool B
 
 
 Pacific Oceania

Pool C
 
 
 

Pool D

Play-offs 

  was promoted to Asia/Oceania Zone Group I in 2018.

Europe/Africa Zone

Group I 
Venue: Tallink Tennis Centre, Tallinn, Estonia (indoor hard)

Dates: 8–11 February

Participating teams

Pool A
  
  
 

Pool C
 
  
  
  

Pool B
  
  
 

Pool D

Play-offs 

Group II 
Venue: Šiauliai Tennis School, Šiauliai, Lithuania (indoor hard)

Dates: 19–22 April

Participating teams

Pool A
 
 
  
  

Pool B

Play-offs 

Group III 
Venue: National Tennis School & Tennis Club Acvila, Chișinău, Moldova (outdoor clay)

Dates: 13–17 June

Participating teams

Pool A
  
  
 

Pool C
 
  
  
  

Pool B
 
  
 
 

Pool D

Play-offs 

References

External links 
 fedcup.com

 
2017
2017 in women's tennis